Christine Mummhardt ( Walther, born 27 December 1951) is a German former volleyball player who competed for East Germany in the 1976 Summer Olympics and in the 1980 Summer Olympics.

She was born in Dresden in 1951.

In 1976 she was part of the East German team which finished sixth in the Olympic tournament. She played all five matches. Four years later, she won a silver medal with the East German team in the 1980 Olympic tournament. She played three matches.

She studied state sciences and was employed first at Volkspolizei (German People's Police) followed by Bundesagentur für Arbeit (Federal Employment Agency).

References 

1951 births
Living people
German women's volleyball players
Olympic volleyball players of East Germany
Volleyball players at the 1976 Summer Olympics
Volleyball players at the 1980 Summer Olympics
Olympic silver medalists for East Germany
Sportspeople from Dresden
Olympic medalists in volleyball
Medalists at the 1980 Summer Olympics
20th-century German women
21st-century German women